Aggai may refer to:

 Aggai, a village near Shashamane, Ethiopia 
 Aggai, an alternative transliteration of Ai (Bible), a city, or two cities with the same name, in ancient Israel
 Saint Aggai, the second Bishop of Edessa, Mesopotamia
 Haggai, a saint and minor prophet

Aggai may also refer to:

 Aggai Khel, a clan of the Tarkani Pashtun tribe
 The Aggai River, in Sefrou Prefecture, Morocco

See also

 Agai (disambiguation)
 Agaie, a historical state in present-day Nigeria
 Agey, a commune in Côte-d'Or, Bourgogne, France 
 Agga (disambiguation)
 Aggay, a barangay (district) of Bantay, Ilocos Sur, Philippines
 Agge (disambiguation)
 Aggey (disambiguation)
 Aggi (disambiguation)
 Aghai, an Irish pentagraph
 Agi (disambiguation)